Oleksandra Andreyevna Karpovich (Олександра Андреевна Карпович, born 6 June 1986) is a Russian retired water polo player. She was a member of the Russia women's national water polo team, playing as a centre forward.

She represented Russia at the 2008 Summer Olympics. On club level she played for SKIF Moscow in Russia.

References

External links
http://www.gettyimages.com/photos/alexander-kleymenov?excludenudity=true&sort=mostpopular&mediatype=photography&phrase=alexander%20kleymenov&family=editorial
http://www.waterpoloworld.com/News/tabid/169/ArticleId/4461/Shturm-Ruza-takes-first-step-to-LEN-Trophy-final.aspx
https://www.swimmingworldmagazine.com/news/usa-wins-fina-junior-womens-world-championships-in-perth-summary/
http://www.waterpoloplanet.com/HTML_link_pages/08_World_League_Super_Final_w.html

1986 births
Living people
Russian female water polo players
Water polo players at the 2008 Summer Olympics
Olympic water polo players of Russia
Sportspeople from Moscow
Universiade medalists in water polo
Universiade bronze medalists for Russia
Medalists at the 2011 Summer Universiade
21st-century Russian women